Manazuru Peninsula is a relatively small peninsula, 7 km long and 1 km wide, in Manazuru, Kanagawa, Japan.

In general
The Manazuru Peninsula is believed to have been formed about 230,000 years ago, together with Mount Maku and other mountains on the southern part of the Old outer rim of the Mount Hakone volcano.

Manazuru Hantō Prefectural Natural Park, located in the Manazuru Peninsula, offers the nature trails, leading to Cape Manazuru, the Three Rocks (三ツ石) and the Shiosai Promenade (潮騒プロムナード).

See also
Fuji-Hakone-Izu National Park

References

External links

Manazuru, Kanagawa
Parks and gardens in Kanagawa Prefecture